Robert Potter may refer to:
Robert Potter (translator) (1721–1804), English translator, poet and cleric
Robert Potter (Irish politician) (died 1854), Member of the UK Parliament for Limerick City
Robert Potter (rugby union), rugby union player who represented Australia
Robert Potter (American politician, died 1842) (c. 1800–1842), Congressional Representative from North Carolina, and later Texas Secretary of the Navy
Robert Brown Potter (1829–1887), American lawyer and soldier
Robert Potter (architect) (1909–2010), English architect
Robert Daniel Potter (1923–2009), U.S. federal judge
Robert L. D. Potter (1833–1893), Wisconsin lawyer and politician
Robert Potter (geographer) (1950–2014), academic